Malikat Agha was a Mongol princess as well as one of the wives of Shah Rukh, ruler of the Timurid Empire.

Life
Malikat Agha was a daughter of the Khan of Moghulistan, Khizr Khoja. Like many other Mongol princesses, she was married into the Timurid dynasty as a means of legitimising the latter's rule. Her husband was Umar Shaikh Mirza I, the eldest son of Timur, while her sister, Tuman Agha, later became the wife of Timur himself. Malikat and her husband had four sons: Pir Muhammad, Iskandar, Bayqara and Ahmad. Following Umar Shaikh's death in 1394, she was subsequently remarried to his younger brother Shah Rukh, through whom she had one further son, Soyughatmish.

In spite of her exalted lineage, upon Shah Rukh's ascension to the throne, Malikat only acted as a junior wife, with the chief wife being the non-royal Gawhar Shad, the daughter of one of Timur's close followers. As such, it is not clear that her influential match brought much advantage to her sons from her first marriage. In fact, it may have been because of these elder sons, most of whom had rebelled in the early years of Shah Rukh's reign, that Malikat had a lower position. This subordinate role even extended to Soyughatmish, who, in comparison to the sons of Gawhar Shad, received a lower military posting from his father, serving in the relatively isolated governorship of Kabul. 

Like many Timurid royal women, Malikat had sponsored the construction of religious buildings, such as Sufi khanqahs. One of the first madrassahs in Herat to specialise in teaching medicine was also established under her patronage, alongside a similar institution in Balkh which further served as a caravansary.

It was in this last structure that she was eventually buried, having predeceased her husband, but outliving several of her sons.

References

Bibliography

14th-century women
15th-century women
15th-century deaths
Year of birth unknown
Timurid princesses
Borjigin